Karoshi is a village panchayat in Belgaum district of Karnataka state of India. Fertile lands and greenery surround the settlement. The main profession of the people here is farming. It is also known for Urdu poetry.

Geography 

The village is located in northern Karnataka, 67 km from its district Belgaum City and 6 km from its taluka Chikodi. Official language is Kannada which is also spoken by the vast majority of the population here and also has a significant Marathi and Hindi speaking population. The village is famous for Ghatti Basavanna temple and Shahnoor Baba Dargah.

Sources  
https://aftabalampatel.blogspot.com/2019/01/25-2018-1308-2018-karoshi-patel-family.html

Villages in Belagavi district